Irish pop singer Ronan Keating has released twelve studio albums, one compilation album and thirty-two singles. His solo career started in 1999 and has spawned nine albums. He gained worldwide attention when his single "When You Say Nothing at All" was featured in the film Notting Hill and peaked at number one in several countries. As a solo artist, he has sold over 20 million records worldwide alongside the 25 million records with Boyzone.

Albums

Studio albums

Live albums

Compilation albums

Box sets

Singles

As lead artist

As featured artist

Other charted songs

Other appearances

Music videos

References

Keating, Ronan
Discographies of Irish artists